, often abbreviated  or just , is a Japanese variety show hosted by popular Japanese owarai duo Downtown, with comedian Hōsei Tsukitei (formerly known as Hōsei Yamasaki) and owarai duo Cocorico co-hosting.  The program has been broadcast on Nippon TV since its pilot episode on October 3, 1989, and continues to this day, celebrating its 1000th episode on April 18, 2010. The program currently broadcasts on Nippon TV and its regional affiliates from 23:25 until 23:55 JST.

Cast

Regular cast
Downtown, one of the most influential and prolific kombi in Japan, who are known for their sarcastic, short-tempered stage personas.
, the boke half of Downtown. Absurdism, sarcasm, and a blunt, ill-tempered persona make up his comedic style. Deadpan is his forté, but he can slip into exaggerated reactions as well.  He is often described as an "M", or masochist.
, the tsukkomi half of Downtown. His quick temper, displays of schadenfreude, and tendency to hit people on their heads are notorious in the owarai world. He is often described as an "S", or sadist.
, part of the regular cast since 1990, when he was part of the comedy duo Team 0, which dissolved in 1993. His role on the show is usually divided between the suberi-kyara (the unfunny character who tries very hard to be funny, but fails) and the ijime-kyara (the underdog who gets bullied and picked on, often physically). Formerly known as Hōsei Yamasaki (山崎 邦正 Yamasaki Hōsei) on the show, however at times the rest of the regulars will call him Yamachan or Hosei-san.
Cocorico, who appeared for the first time in 1994 as guests, but who only in 1997 become regular members of the program. Although they are already veteran comedians, Cocorico are considered the juniors of Gaki no Tsukai and are treated like this on the show, since they are the youngest.
, the boke half and leader of Cocorico. He usually appears as a nice, cute and kind man, but in such segments as Stalking Tanaka, the "Tanaka's Breakdown" Series or TANAKER, he plays an "evil" or "rebel" version of himself. Tanaka has a clumsy, fearful and overdramatic persona, and he's often the target of scary pranks (when he usually falls over) and the classic "Thai Kick". He is also an actor and appears as the main character in occasional drama segments.
, the tsukkomi half of Cocorico. In the 2000s his character was a cool but perverted man, but over the years Endo's persona became slightly boke and the "pervert" angle became less pronounced. Nowadays Endo portrays himself as a untalented person on the show, with poor acting skills as opposed to Tanaka. Endo's most famous gags include "Ho-ho-hoi" (a humorous song and dance in some state of undress finishing with the phrase) and the fictional wrestler Dynamite Shikoku.

Former regular cast 

 , Hōsei's former partner at Team 0. He left the program at 1993 and left the comedy career, since he was becoming more interested in filmmaking.

Supporting cast
  ( and ). A comedy duo that works at the show and has occasionally joined the regular cast. Fujiwara is also known as "Vacuum Fujiwara" because of his eating ability, which is used as a running gag in some skits.
 . Often called by his stage name, . He made several appearances in pre-taped segments that are shown to the cast in the "No-Laughing" batsu games, since 2005. In the videos, Onishi portrays an inane version of himself appearing in various roles, saying or doing things that are inane/off-the-wall, usually repeatedly, in an attempt to make the cast laugh. His most infamous recurring trait is his difficulty pronouncing the English language.
 . Former chief producer. Appears in various sketches often as himself or as various characters during batsu games. As well as appearing in person during these, his likeness is often used for comedic effect in various ways—for instance, appearing on humorous posters, or as a stone bust. The name "Gāsū" (ガースー), a reversal of the kana in his given name, is also referenced in similar ways. He retired from the show in late 2017.
 . Chief director. Usually referred to by his nickname, Heipō (ヘイポー). Several sketches and games are based on his complete inability to stomach scary things (however silly they may be) and his perverted nature. He also appears whenever the cast needs an extra man around such as in "Silent Library" and "No Laughing at the News Agency" where he and Tanaka were paired up to do a Blair Witch kind of challenge in a nearby forest. He also took Hamada's place in the "Kiki Ketchup" series when the former was hospitalized.
 . Downtown's former manager. Often seen portraying a female character during batsu games, where he meets up with the participants and guides them through the game. He often stutters. He also generally displays a great deal of incompetence in serious matters.
 . Producer of the show, often used when a sixth person is needed for a skit.  Has appeared in batsu games and has shown his ability to withstand pain.
 . A member of the comedy duo 130R and former cast member of Downtown's Gottsu Ee Kanji. Appears often in batsu games. Itao has had six different women portraying his "wife" throughout the series, one of whom, Sherri, is best known for her dancing along to Madonna (namely, "Material Girl" and "Like a Virgin") in the No Laughing High School batsu game and the No Laughing at the Police Station batsu game.

Recurring guests
Ameagari Kesshitai ( and ). A comedy duo that has occasionally joined the regular cast.
浅見千代子 (Asami, Chiyoko) and 三城晃子 (Mishiro, Akiko); literally, Old Lady #1 and Old Lady #3. Two elderly women who often appear in the batsu games
David Hossein
 Director role played by Craig Nine.
Another comedian who makes appearances during the batsu games.
. A former Miss Japan who later became a physician.
. Endō's ex-wife (they divorced in December 2007). She usually appears in No Laughing series, making Endo get embarrassed.
Maejima Koichi, as 
.
.
Hackam Naronpat. A professional Thai-Kick Boxer.
. a retired professional wrestler, usually appears in No Laughing series by giving Hōsei a slap to the face.
. A rakugo artist.
. A Japanese fashion model and tarento.
.
: Appeared in two year end batsu games with comic Yuki Himura.
Shoji Murakami.
. A TV personality known for his cross-dressing persona.
Moriman.
Suga Tomio, as Piccadilly Umeda.
Egashira 2:50.

Broadcasting TV stations
 Nippon TV, Aomori Broadcasting Corp., Miyagi TV, Akita Broadcasting System, Inc., Yamagata Broadcasting Co., Fukushima Central TV, Yamanashi Broadcasting System, TV Niigata, TV Shinshu, Kitanihon Broadcasting Co., TV Kanazawa, Fukui Broadcasting Co.,Shizuoka Daiichi TV, Chukyo TV, Yomiuri TV, Nihonkai TV, Yamaguchi Broadcasting Co., Shikoku Broadcasting Co. Nishinippon Broadcasting Co., Nankai Broadcasting Co., Kochi Broadcasting Co.,Fukuoka Broadcasting Corp. Nagasaki International TV, Kumamoto Kemmin TV, TV Ōita, Kagoshima Yomiuri TV
 Sapporo TV
 TV Iwate
 Hiroshima TV
 Ryukyu Broadcasting Corp. (affiliated with JNN and TBS Network)

References

External links 
 

Japanese variety television shows
Japanese comedy television series
Nippon TV original programming
1989 Japanese television series debuts
1980s Japanese television series
1990s Japanese television series
2000s Japanese television series
2010s Japanese television series
2020s Japanese television series